The War in 2020 is a 1991 war-adventure novel written by Ralph Peters. Taking place in a future dystopia, the novel's plot is spread over 15 years and mostly features the United States' efforts to defend the Soviet Union against an alliance of Japan, South Africa, and the Arab Islamic Union, a confederation of militant Islamic states. The novel follows the career of U.S. Army air cavalry officer George Taylor as he leads his troopers in wars abroad and civil conflict at home.

Background
During the 1990s, intense trade competition gradually makes Japan a major trading power against the United States and the European Union, which gradually worked for the dissolution of NATO. The Japanese also use their position to expand the mandate of the Self-Defense Forces and even export its military technology.

The U.S. military draws down its forces for most of the 1990s, starting with deployments during Operation Desert Shield and Latin American interventions, while disarming most of its nuclear arsenal, in parallel with the (fictionally perennial) Soviet Union; in addition, the drawdowns affect the military intelligence community due to what was proving to be over-dependence on automated means of intelligence gathering. The situation comes to a head in 2005 when instability in Zaire's Shaba province prompts the South African Defence Force (equipped and trained by Japan) to seize mineral-rich sections of the area. The United States sends the XVIII Airborne Corps along with associated air and naval assets to repel the aggression.

Plot
The U.S. military is deployed to Africa to stop a South African invasion of Zaire's Shaba province. Captain George Taylor of the U.S. Army is leading an Apache gunship squadron, patrolling over Shaba province, when advanced South African gunships destroy it. After crashing and mercy-killing his fatally wounded gunner, he finds an abandoned Army camp, and forages supplies for a long trek, initially on foot, to the Zairean capital, Kinshasa. Along the way he learns that the attack on his squadron was part of a bigger South African offensive that had targeted U.S. forces in Zaire; South African commandos and Zairean guerrillas allied with the South Africans also destroy B-2 bombers at an airbase in Kinshasa. The American collapse was so swift that the U.S. President is only able to force  a cease-fire (and South African withdrawal) by carrying out a nuclear strike on Pretoria, an action that had reaped  heavy international condemnation. The EU disavows its original support for the U.S. operation while Japan uses the war as an excuse to launch a mercantilist trade war against America: it embargoes countries that continue to trade with the U.S., though continuing to sell its own products there.

Taylor is evacuated home to the U.S., but finds himself suffering from a new virus designated "Runciman's Disease" (RD), which leaves his face horribly scarred. Many returning U.S. soldiers are similarly  infected; it spreads around the worldwide in a global pandemic. Japan puts its Home Islands under quarantine, with Okinawa being used exclusively  for international trade. A nuclear war in the Middle East, some time after the Shaba disaster, destroys Israel.

In 2008, Taylor leads a U.S. Army unit into Los Angeles, as the military is put on domestic deployment combating social unrest, and protecting delivery of basic services in the wake of the RD outbreak. Several years later, Taylor deploys with U.S. forces to Mexico, to eradicate a Japanese-supported revolutionary government that had won control; his disfigured face, and unique tactics, strike fear among the rebels.

The Soviet Union, meanwhile, is on the brink of internal collapse in 2020, as its Central Asian republics  ally with other Japanese-supported Islamic nations in conquering the country's resource-laden territory for Japan's benefit, and also conduct genocide against ethnic Russians. The United States reorganizes its military, and secretly deploys a combat unit — the 7th Heavy Cavalry Regiment (7HCR) — under by-then Colonel Taylor's command, spearheaded by the new M-100 assault gunship (which are equipped with an advanced railgun and Gatling cannons). The capture of an advanced Japanese AI interface enables the United States and Soviet Union to gain a better grasp of Japanese command-and-control abilities.

The U.S. military command orders the open deployment of the 7HCR to strike a blow deep into the heart of the Arab Islamic Union lines in northern Kazakhstan, and help bolster Soviet defenses. The initial U.S. attacks on November 2, 2020, render heavy damage to the Islamic Union and their allied Iranian forces, especially when a repair depot in Karaganda is totally destroyed. Taylor's troops reposition to new deployment areas in the Ural river region, but a stray radio transmission gives the Japanese a clue to one assembly area near Orsk. The information prompts the Japanese to target it with the Scramblers, a special radiowave weapon that permanently disrupts the body's neuro-muscular functions while leaving the brain intact. When Taylor discovers the area, he is appalled at the weapon's effects; General Noburu Kabata, the Japanese theater commander, is horrified that the weapon was used over his objections.

The fallout from the Scramblers' deployment shocks the U.S. government, which proposes negotiating a ceasefire. Taylor proposes leading all his remaining forces into a surgical strike at the Japanese headquarters in Baku, with logistical support from the Soviets. However, on November 4, the Soviets turn on the Americans as they gather at the last jump-off point north of the Caspian Sea; Taylor's forces escape the trap and head for the Japanese headquarters, which is itself under siege from Azeri militants. Despite a withdrawal order from Washington, the U.S. troops storm the command center and Taylor kills Kabata, while a U.S. technician uses the center's advanced supercomputer to disable Japan's space defenses and other in-theater assets. Japanese relief columns arrive at the base and Taylor dies staying behind to shut down the computer, while the rest of his men fly to Turkey.

The epilogue shows that the attack led to a peace treaty signed between the USSR and its enemies. The 7HCR is commended by presidential order, with all survivors promoted, but some of Taylor's men voluntarily reassign to other units out of dissatisfaction with its new pompous commanding officer.

Characters

Americans
 Col. George Taylor
The novel's lead character. Taylor is a highly successful helicopter pilot who reads classical literature. He is known for humming the classic Irish air "Garryowen" and keeps a special cavalry guidon streamer by his person. The disfiguration of Taylor's face as a result of being infected with Runciman's Disease later reaps him the moniker "El Diablo" during the Mexico operation. Taylor's leadership of the 7HCR and his stand in Baku later reaps him a posthumous Medal of Honor and a special exhibit at the Cavalry Museum in Fort Riley, Kansas.

 Lt Col. Thomas Reno
The 7HCR's deputy commander, Reno is seen as an attention-seeking officer who has reporters following him. His propensity to talk over the radio, despite orders of radio silence, leads the Japanese to an assembly area where the Scramblers are eventually deployed. Reno, who comes from a military family, is promoted to colonel and given command of the 7th.

 Lt. Col. Howard 'Merry' Meredith
One of the very few US Army officers not be affected by RD, Meredith entered the service over his parents' objections. He and Taylor being work together during the Los Angeles deployment in 2008. The reorganization of the 7HCR makes him uncomfortable and he transfers to Fort Huachuca to run the Army intelligence training school.

 Maj. Manuel Xavier "Manny" Martinez
A Mexican-American from a tough background in San Antonio, Martinez serves in the 7HCR as Taylor's senior maintenance officer. He personally attends to the regiment's machines but dies in an enemy bombing of the city of Omsk while finishing repairs to an M-100.

 Jonathan Waters
The United States' first African-American president, Waters supports the US effort in the USSR and approves Taylor's attack plan for Baku against his Cabinet's opposition. However, he later dies of a heart attack in his sleep.

 Clifton Bouquette.
The director of the Unified Intelligence Agency (the successor to the United States Intelligence Community), Bouquette seeks out sexual relationships outside his marriage, leading to his divorce on Christmas Day in 2020. He also opposes Taylor's war strategy and downplays his success.

 Daisy Fitzgerald
A UIA analyst who loves Colonel Taylor, Daisy is concerned about him not coming back from Russia. She does not attend Taylor's memorial service and later sleeps with Bouquette.

Japanese
Noburu Kabata
The commander of all Japanese forces in Soviet Central Asia, Kabata previously served in Zaire and was part of an evacuation crew for Israelis after the Jewish state is destroyed in a nuclear war. A man with a taste for fine living, Kabata is an avid golf player and prefers bespoke suits.

Soviets
 Colonel Viktor Kozlov
A former GRU officer assigned as the 7HCR's Soviet Army liaison, Kozlov is often mocked for his broken teeth and bad breath. He later provides Taylor with information on Japan's Baku headquarters, remembering the layout from his service with the Soviet Army occupation forces years earlier.

 Major Yuri Babryshkin
A Soviet tank brigade commander assigned to the Kokchetav front, Babryshkin is appalled at a chemical warfare attack on nearby civilians. The KGB executes him for supposed treason.

 Valya Babryshkina
Yuri's wife, Valya is a prostitute making the rounds in Moscow. She is devastated by her husband's execution but gets over it when she meets an American warrant officer who later proposes to her.

Critical reception
The book earned highly positive reviews.

Kirkus Reviews lauded the book for its gripping writing and material that's easy for non-military readers to understand.

Publishers Weekly criticized Peters' portrayal of Muslim troops as savages, but praised the book for showing the "grim nature" of military life.

References

1991 American novels
1990s novels
American adventure novels
Fiction set in the 2000s
Fiction set in 2008
Fiction set in 2020
American war novels
Novels set in Los Angeles
Novels set in South Africa
Novels set in Kazakhstan
Novels set in the Democratic Republic of the Congo
Novels set in the Soviet Union
Novels set in Mexico
Dystopian novels
Military of the United States in fiction
Japan Self-Defense Forces in fiction
Pocket Books books
Novels set in fictional wars